The 1992 South African Open, also known by its sponsored name Panasonic South African Open, was a men's tennis tournament played on hard courts. It was the 87th edition of the South African Open and was part of the ATP World Series of the 1992 ATP Tour. It took place in Johannesburg, South Africa from 30 March through 5 April 1992.

It was the first time that the tournament had been held since 1989. Aaron Krickstein won the singles title and in an all-South African doubles final, Pieter Aldrich and Danie Visser overcame Wayne Ferreira and Pieter Norval.

Finals

Singles
 Aaron Krickstein defeated  Alexander Volkov, 6–4, 6–4 
 It was Krickstein's only singles title of the year and the 8th of his career.

Doubles
 Pieter Aldrich /  Danie Visser defeated  Wayne Ferreira /  Pieter Norval, 6–4, 6–4

References

External links
 Official website
 ITF tournament edition details

South African Open (tennis)
South African Open (tennis)
Open
Sports competitions in Johannesburg
1990s in Johannesburg
South African Open (tennis)
South African Open (tennis)